Krzysztof Bosak (born 13 June 1982) is a far-right Polish politician. He was a member of the Sejm for the League of Polish Families from 2005 to 2007 and has been a member of the Sejm again since 2019 for the Confederation. Bosak was the chairman of the All-Polish Youth from 2005 to 2006 and was one of the founders and the current vice-chairman of the National Movement. He was a candidate for president in 2020.

Early life and education 
Bosak was born in Zielona Góra. He trained acrobatics in his youth, as well as windsurfing, and was a sailing instructor. He joined ZHP.

From 2001 to 2004, he studied architecture at Wrocław University of Science and Technology. From 2004 to 2008, he studied economics at the SGH Warsaw School of Economics. He also studied philosophy at a private university. He did not complete any of his studies.

Political career 

He was elected to the Sejm on 25 September 2005, getting 3764 votes in 8 – Zielona Góra as a candidate from the League of Polish Families list. Thus, he was the second-youngest person ever elected to the Polish Sejm. He took part in the sixth Polish edition of Dancing with the Stars.

On 13 June 2008, he resigned his membership of the League of Polish Families and backed out from political life. In 2011, he took part in Congress of the New Right but never joined the party. Later he became one of the founders of the National Movement.

He contested the 2019 European Parliament election, but was not elected as the coalition did not pass the electoral threshold of 5%.

In the 2019 Polish parliamentary election, he was elected member of the Sejm. He received 22,158 votes in the 33- Kielce. He was named the vice-chairman and spokesperson for Confederation in the Sejm.

He was a candidate in the 2020 Confederation presidential primary. He has a strong support among the many factions in his political group as well as the general public. He won the nomination held at the party convention in Warsaw on 18 January. In the election he finished in fourth place receiving 6.8% and over 1.3 million votes.

Political stances 
Bosak is a hard eurosceptic who is actively pursuing a Polish withdrawal from the EU. He identifies as a national conservative and a traditional Catholic. In his view, the major right-wing parties of Western Europe have capitulated to the liberal revolution and no longer promote conservative values. He is also critical of the Law and Justice party, which, according to him, will most likely follow the same path as right-wing parties in the West.

Electoral history

Presidential

Personal life 
Bosak is married to Karina, a lawyer working for a right-wing populist, conservative Catholic law organization Ordo Iuris. He has 2 sons.

See also
 Members of Polish Sejm 2005-2007
 Members of the Polish Sejm 2019–2023

References

External links
Krzysztof Bosak - parliamentary page - includes declarations of interest, voting record, and transcripts of speeches.

1982 births
Living people
People from Zielona Góra
Far-right politics in Poland
Members of the Polish Sejm 2005–2007
Members of the Polish Sejm 2019–2023
League of Polish Families politicians
Polish traditionalist Catholics
Critics of Islamism
Anti-Islam sentiment in Poland
Polish monarchists
Candidates in the 2020 Polish presidential election
Confederation Liberty and Independence politicians